Patto were an English rock band, formed in London in 1970.

Founded by vocalist Mike Patto, their lineup was taken from Timebox, consisting of vocalist Patto, guitarist and vibraphone player Ollie Halsall, bassist Clive Griffiths and drummer John Halsey.

Early days and singles
Timebox developed from a complicated pedigree that included members of The Bo Street Runners, Patto's People and Chicago Blue Line. This soul psych pop combo made two singles for Pye's label Piccadilly before signing to Decca's Deram in 1967. They also recorded five singles for Deram between 1967 and 1969 and appeared on BBC radio shows such as Noise at Nine, Stuart Henry on Sunday and Jimmy Young. Keyboard player Chris Holmes left after their last single release and they began experimenting with progressive rock.

Progressive rock
In 1970, Patto was formed by members of Timebox and signed to the newly formed Vertigo label. With Muff Winwood as producer, they recorded their first album live in the studio.

In December 1971, Patto entered the studio again to record their second album, Hold Your Fire, after which they were dropped from the Vertigo roster. Despite poor record sales, they were becoming known as an exciting live act. Through his connections in England, Muff Winwood was able to have the band signed to Island, and they recorded the album Roll 'em Smoke 'em Put Another Line Out in 1972.

In 1973, the band began to record their fourth album. Mike Patto wrote songs that were less cynical than the usual Patto material and much more commercial. The ensuing album, Monkey's Bum, was not released. Without Halsall and with each member now involved in other projects, Mike Patto chose to disband Patto, going on to form Boxer with Halsall.

In 2009, Patto's song "The Man" was used in trailers for the film Observe and Report starring Seth Rogen and Anna Faris and was included along with another track, "Sittin' Back Easy", on the film's soundtrack.

Band members
 Mike Patto – vocals
 Ollie Halsall – lead guitar, acoustic guitar, piano, vibraphone
 Clive Griffiths – bass
 John Halsey – drums

Discography

Studio albums
 1970 – Patto
 1971 – Hold Your Fire
 1972 – Roll 'em Smoke 'em Put Another Line Out
 2017 – Monkey's Bum (recorded 1973 but no authorised release until 2017)

Live albums
 2000 – Warts and All

References

External links
 Bo Street Runners Story
 pattofan

English rock music groups
English blues rock musical groups
English progressive rock groups
English jazz-rock groups
Musical groups established in 1970
Musical groups disestablished in 1973
Vertigo Records artists
Island Records artists